Mastoides is a genus of air-breathing land snails, terrestrial pulmonate gastropod mollusks in the family Enidae.

Species
Species within the genus Mastoides include:
 Mastoides albocostatus (Westerlund, 1896)
 Mastoides obeliscus Schileyko, 2007
 Mastoides orloffensis (Kobelt, 1905)

References

Enidae